Saint-Pardoult is a commune in the Charente-Maritime department in southwestern France.

Geography
The village lies on the right bank of the Boutonne, which forms all of the commune's eastern border.

Population

See also
Communes of the Charente-Maritime department

References

Communes of Charente-Maritime
Charente-Maritime communes articles needing translation from French Wikipedia